Asclepius (Latin Aesculapius) is the Greek god of medicine and healing.

Asclepius (also spelled Asklepios or Asclepios) may also refer to:

 Asclepius (treatise), a Hermetic treatise written –300
 Asclepius, one of the Argonauts, a band of heroes in Greek mythology
 Asclepius of Tralles, Alexandrian scholar (died –570)
 Asclepius, mid-fifth century Catholic bishop of Baia, Numidia
 A town in Pontus, now İskilip, Asian Turkey
 Asklepios Kliniken, German private hospitals group
 Asclepius (Sikelianos), tragedy by Angelos Sikelianos
 4581 Asclepius, an asteroid
 Awali (river), formerly known as  the River Asclepius

See also 
 Asclepias
 Asclepiades (disambiguation)
 Ophiuchus (astrology)
 Temple of Asclepius (disambiguation)